Pseudocedrela is a monotypic genus of flowering plants belonging to the family Meliaceae. The only species is Pseudocedrela kotschyi.

Its native range is Western Tropical Africa to Ethiopia and Uganda.

References

Meliaceae
Meliaceae genera
Monotypic Sapindales genera